The National Commission for the Accreditation of Special Education Services (NCASES) is a subsidiary of the National Association of Private Special Education Centers established in the United States in 1993. NCASES provides an accreditation process and standards "to ensure that students in private special education are provided safe and healthy work environments that are conducive to learning". NCASES accreditation standards "are designed to differentiate superior quality from mere adequacy".

Purpose 
Noting that NCAES evaluates institutions based on 30 core standards, and a total of 187 standards, The Record of Hackensack, New Jersey, wrote:

Process 
Dustin Holt of The Record Observer in Easton, Maryland wrote, "NCASES evaluates private special education programs through a process that encourages diversity of educational practice and innovation. The process assures students in private special education settings are provided environments that are healthy, safe, comfortable and conducive to learning."

The Hartford Courant described the process of a site visit:

References

External links 

 

Professional associations based in the United States
Educational accreditation
School accreditors